Cougar Gulch is a valley in the U.S. state of Washington.

Cougar Gulch was named for the fact a cougar was killed by a hunter in this valley.

References

Landforms of Kittitas County, Washington
Valleys of Washington (state)